The women's singles tennis tournament at the 2014 South American Games in Santiago was held from 10 to 16 March on the clay courts of the Estadio Nacional Julio Martínez Prádanos in Ñuñoa.

All matches were the best of three sets, with tie-breaks used in every set.

Chilean Cecilia Costa was the defending champion, but lost in second round to Paraguayan Montserrat González.

Brazilian Paula Cristina Gonçalves defeated Paraguayan Verónica Cepede Royg 6–1, 4–6, 6–4 in the final to claim the only gold medal for Brazil in the tennis competition.

Calendar
Matches took place between 10 and 16 March 2014.

Seeds

Draw

Finals

Top half

Bottom half

References
 Main Draw (Federación de Tenis de Chile)

Tennis at the 2014 South American Games
South